MicroAge is an American technology company based in Tempe, Arizona. Founded in 1976.

In 2020 MicroAge's chief operating officer, Rob Zack, stepped into the chief executive role.

On October 1, 2020, MicroAge announced that it had acquired Semaphore Co, a cloud-services organization based out of Atlanta, Georgia.

History
In 1976, founders Jeffrey D. McKeever and Alan Hald opened one of the first hobby computer stores in the United States, The Byte Shop, in Tempe, Arizona. The company grew quickly and in 1979 opened the first MicroAge Computer Store at Paradise Valley Mall in Phoenix, Arizona. The store sold computers popular in the early home computer age, such as the Apple II, Northstar, Imsai and Altair computers.

MicroAge developed into a major national distributor as well as having its own chain of stores, becoming the most widely known franchiser in the computer industry with over 1400 franchises worldwide, including locations in Europe, Japan and the USSR. Its primary competitor at the time was ComputerLand, another well-known franchising operation. The company was listed on the Fortune 500 list from 1995 to 2001. It employed over 6,000 people and generated revenues in excess of $9 billion at its zenith.

By February 2000, the company was composed of four subsidiary parts: MicroAge Teleservices, MicroAge Technology Services, Pinacor, and Quality Integration Services. In November 2000, MicroAge Teleservices was sold to that subsidiaries largest customer, United Parcel Service. In December 2000, MicroAge Technology Services was sold to CompuCom, included MicroAge's network of service and support locations. In May 2001 some assets of Pinacor were sold to ScanSource.

In July 2022, MicroAge acquired cStor, a cybersecurity consulting firm, for an undisclosed sum.

References

Companies based in Tempe, Arizona